Benoit-Antoine Bacon is a Canadian neuropsychologist and is the 15th President and Vice-Chancellor of Carleton University.

Early life and education

Born in Montreal, he graduated from Concordia University with a B.A. (Honours) degree in Psychology in 1995. He received his PhD in Neuropsychology from the University of Montreal in 1999 and completed a post-doctoral fellowship at the University of Glasgow in Scotland.

Career

His first academic appointment was in the Department of Psychology at Bishop's University. Following serious labour strife at Bishop’s, he was asked to serve as Chief Negotiator for the union (APBU) and led the settlement of several collective agreements. He later served as Chair of Psychology, Dean of Arts and Science, and Associate VP Research at the institution.

In 2013 he was hired as Provost and Vice-President (Academic Affairs) at his alma mater Concordia University. In 2016, he moved to Ontario to serve as Provost and Vice-President (Academic) at Queen's University.

On May 1, 2018 he was announced as the 15th President of Carleton University in Ottawa, succeeding interim President Alastair Summerlee. He began his mandate on July 1, 2018, at the same time as Carleton Board Chair Nik Nanos. Together they announced Yaprak Baltacioğlu as the 12th Chancellor of the institution in December 2018.

Personal life

To contribute to breaking down the stigma around mental health and substance use, Bacon has shared his difficult upbringing in a dysfunctional family and subsequent challenges in early adulthood

References

Neuropsychologists
Canadian psychologists
Presidents of Carleton University
Scientists from Montreal
Concordia University alumni
Université de Montréal alumni
Academic staff of Bishop's University